The 1961 Kita Mino earthquake is an earthquake that occurred on August 19, 1961, near the border between Ishikawa, Fukui and Gifu Prefectures in Japan. The magnitude was 7.0. The earthquake left 8 people dead and 43 people injured.

References

External links 

 北美濃地震調査報告 - 気象庁 験震時報第27巻 
 

North Mino earthquake
North Mino earthquake
North Mino earthquake
Earthquakes of the Showa period